Nanny Daddy  (奶爸百分百) is a Singaporean drama that aired on Mediacorp Channel 8. It debuted on 2 September 2008 and consists of 20 episodes.

Cast

Synopsis
From Mediacorp: Liu Zhuo Lun (Adrian Pang) is a successful 40-something investment consultant and is seen as an eligible bachelor. However, he is a stubborn man, and has an obsessive compulsive disorder for cleanliness, thus is extremely difficult to get along with. When a new neighbour Lin Ai Hua (Yvonne Lim), a divorcee with a son moves in, conflict ensues between them.

Unforeseen circumstances force Zhuo Lun to care for his sister’s 9 month-old infant, Nicole, but he fumbles and is at a loss as to what to do. Reluctantly, Ai Hua comes to his rescue.

Zhuo Lun becomes a changed man after spending time taking care of Nicole. And Ai Hua develops a liking for him but has to hide it because her son dislikes him.

Everything changes with the return of Nicole’s mother and Zhuo Lun, unwilling to leave the baby, becomes her godfather instead. With Nicole in tow, he sets on a quest to confess his love for Ai Hua. Will she accept him? Will her son get in the way?

Accolades

Star Awards 2009

External links
Nanny Daddy on Mediacorp

References

Singapore Chinese dramas
2008 Singaporean television series debuts
2008 Singaporean television series endings
Channel 8 (Singapore) original programming